The men's T38 200 metres competition of the athletics events at the 2015 Parapan American Games was held on August 13 at the CIBC Athletics Stadium. The defending Parapan American Games champion was Edson Pinheiro of Brazil.

Records
Prior to this competition, the existing records were as follows:

Records Broken

Schedule
All times are Central Standard Time (UTC-6).

Results
All times are shown in seconds.

Semifinals
The fastest three from each heat and next two overall fastest qualified for the final.

Semifinal 1
Wind: -2.4 m/s

Semifinal 2
Wind: -1.9 m/s

Final
Wind: -0.6 m/s

References

Athletics at the 2015 Parapan American Games